The Ferrari Dino 166 F2 was an open-wheel Formula 2 race car, designed, developed, and built by Italian racing team Scuderia Ferrari, in 1967. A total of seven models were manufactured and produced.

History and races
The Scuderia's activities in Formula 2 remained limited. Ferrari had already built monopostos according to Formula 2 regulations, but only when the Formula 1 World Championship (partly in the 1950s) held its races on the basis of Formula 2.

In 1967, the Formula 2 European Championship was introduced as a separate racing series. The Ferrari Dino 166 F2 was developed for this series. The car had a six-cylinder engine based on the Dino V-6 from the road car. The chassis consisted of tubes and sheet metal. The Scuderia brought the Dino to the start of a race only once, in 1967. In 1968 efforts became more serious. The engine was equipped with 24 valves, the car was revised. Ernesto Brambilla and Derek Bell finished third and fourth in the championship.

The Formula 2 program ended at the end of 1969. Bell finished fifth and Brambilla eighth in the championship. However, the car was used for a short time. At the turn of the year 1969/1970, Andrea de Adamich drove the Argentine Temporada, a series of monoposto vehicles, but without great success. Chris Amon showed that the car was fundamentally competitive with his overall victory in the Tasman series in spring 1969.

Specifications

Ferrari Dino 166 F2
Engine: Ferrari V six-cylinder (65°), mid-engine (longitudinally behind the driver)
Displacement (bore × stroke):  (×)
Compression: 11.0:1
Power output: 200 hp (147 kW) at 10,000 rpm
Valve control: Double-overhead camshafts per cylinder bank, 3-valves per cylinder
Fuel system: Lucas indirectly
Lubrication: Dry-sump
Transmission: five-speed gearbox, rear-wheel drive
Chassis and body: Semi-monocoque and tubular steel spaceframe, with riveted aluminum plates
Suspension (front and rear): double wishbones (different lengths), internal coil springs and shock absorbers, anti-roll bar
Steering system: Rack and pinion steering
Brakes: Disc brakes
Wheelbase: 
Front/rear track width: /
Length of the vehicle: 
Tire size front/rear: 550/950×13/600/1200×13
Fuel tank capacity: 
Curb weight (without driver):

References

166 F2
Open wheel racing cars
Formula Two cars